Ned Napier (born 1 September 1995) is an Australian actor. He plays Alex King   on the Australian children's television series Worst Year of My Life Again, which premiered on 26 April 2014. He also stars in Suburbs (2014) and Riley (2013).

Appearances

In 2014 Napier was honored to be a panelist for Trop Jr, the world's largest short film festival for children.

He appeared in a third series episode of the television drama The Doctor Blake Mysteries, which stars Craig McLachlan.

Filmography

References

External links

Australian male television actors
1995 births
Living people